Human remains dog may refer to:
Police dog
Search and rescue dog